Maranda is a suburb in Palampur City on the Kangra district in Indian state of Himachal Pradesh, India. Dharamshala is the administrative headquarters of the Kangra district.

Maranda is a suburb in  Palampur which is a green hill station and a municipal Corporation in the Kangra Valley in the Indian state of Himachal Pradesh. It is surrounded on all sides by tea gardens and pine forests which merge with the Dhauladhar ranges. Palampur is the tea capital of northwest India but tea is just one aspect that makes Palampur a special interest place. Abundance of water and proximity to the mountains has endowed it with a mild climate.
The village has a railway station to hill station Palampur. The railway line is connected using narrow gauge tracks from Pathankot to Jogindernagar. Maranda is also known locally for a renowned Rotary eye hospital in the region.

See also
Palampur
Kangra Valley
Kangra district

Notes and references

Further reading
 Hutchinson, J. & J. PH Vogel (1933). History of the Panjab Hill States, Vol. I. 1st edition: Govt. Printing, Pujab, Lahore, 1933. Reprint 2000. Department of Language and Culture, Himachal Pradesh. Chapter V Kangra State, pp. 99–198.

External links
 Kangra District, Official website
 Distt Profile

Maranda